Miss Universe Nepal (MUN) is a beauty pageant competition. The contest selects the country representative for Miss Universe. The current Miss Universe Nepal is Sophiya Bhujel from Kathmandu.

History 
Miss Universe Nepal officially began in 2017 and the first title was handed over to Nagma Shrestha. The contest was conducted by Hidden Treasure Nepal until 2019 when Brave, Bold & Beautiful (previously known as Ma: Nepali) became the official franchisee for Miss Universe on 11 June 2020. During a digital press conference on 11 June 2020, it was announced that Miss Universe Nepal will be an all digital competition starting right from the registration; participants will be able to register themselves through the MUN app.

Titleholders

Winners by district / country

Nepal's Representatives at Miss Universe

Miss Universe Nepal Score table

See also 

 Miss Teen Nepal
 Miss Nepal

References

Nepal
Beauty pageants in Nepal
Recurring events established in 2017
2017 establishments in Nepal